Tolpia conscitulana is a moth of the family Erebidae first described by Francis Walker in 1863. It is known from Borneo.

References

Micronoctuini
Taxa named by Michael Fibiger
Moths described in 1863